Shahrak-e Sadra (also Romanized as Shahrak-e Şadrā) is a village in Rostaq Rural District, in the Central District of Neyriz County, Fars Province, Iran. At the 2006 census, its population was 28, in 8 families.

References 

Populated places in Neyriz County